"Amos Moses" is a song written and recorded by American musician Jerry Reed. It was released in October 1970 as the fourth and final single from the album Georgia Sunshine and was his highest-charting single on the Billboard Hot 100, bowing at #97 on October 31, 1970, and peaking at #8 on February 27 and March 6, 1971. It has been used ever since as a line dance taught at YMCAs. "Amos Moses" was certified gold for sales of 1 million units by the RIAA. It was #28 on Billboard's Year-End Hot 100 singles of 1971 and also appeared on several other countries' charts.

Content
The song tells the story of a one-armed Cajun alligator poacher named Amos Moses, son of "Doc Milsap" and his wife Hannah, who lived "about 45 minutes southeast of Thibodaux, Louisiana." The song tells the story of Amos's life, including his troubles with the law for illegally hunting alligators, including how a sheriff "snuck in the swamp [to] get the boy, but he never come out again."

It is not absolutely clear that Amos's father was named "Doc Milsap", as the lyric is difficult to interpret from the recording.  However, live performance video contemporary to the original release date seems to support the “Doc Milsap” lyric. Various incantations have been assumed over the years, such as "Doc Mills South" and most commonly "Duckbill Sam". The latter is given credence from existing video of Reed in comedy sketches involving the song, where it appears he may in fact say "Duck Bill Sam", and also the assumption that a "doctor" (Doc) wouldn't fit the bill as a father throwing his son in the swamp as "alligator bait". Lyric sheets from CMT and other reputable sources cannot be relied upon: some fail to even spell "Thibodaux" correctly, billing it as "Tibido" or even "Tippietoe". It might also be that Reed had two separate sets of lyrics, and, unable to complete either, decided to put the two together, with the funnier version first, as a hook.

Appearances in other media
The song appears in the video game Grand Theft Auto: San Andreas on country radio station K-Rose.

The song was featured in an episode of the TV show My Name Is Earl.

It was covered by Les Claypool twice: on Primus's Rhinoplasty EP and on his 2014 Duo de Twang album. It's also been covered by Alabama 3 on their album M.O.R. and by the Pleasure Barons on their 1993 album Live in Las Vegas, with Mojo Nixon on lead vocals. Cross Canadian Ragweed covered the song on 1999's Live and Loud at the Wormy Dog Saloon. Lou Reid also did a bluegrass cover of Amos Moses in 2021.

A version of "Amos Moses" featured on The Sensational Alex Harvey Band's 1976 album SAHB Stories.

The character Amos Moses features as the trapper in Walter Hill's film Southern Comfort played by Brion James.

Chart performance

Weekly charts

Year-end charts

References

1970 singles
Jerry Reed songs
Fictional Cajuns
Song recordings produced by Chet Atkins
Songs written by Jerry Reed
1970 songs
RCA Records singles
Novelty songs
Swamp rock songs
Primus (band) songs
Songs about fictional male characters